Guoqing Township is a township in Jiangcheng Hani and Yi Autonomous County, Yunnan, China.

Administrative division
As of 2016, the township is divided into six villages: 
 Medeng
 Luojie
 Tianfang
 Heping
 Habo
 Gale

Geography
The township is situated at the central Jiangcheng Hani and Yi Autonomous County. The town shares a border with Baozang Town to the west, Qushui Town to the east, Jiahe Township to the north, and Menglie Town to the south.

Economy
The economy of the township has a predominantly agricultural orientation, including farming and pig-breeding. Tea and sugarcane are the economic plants of this region.

Demographics

As of 2017, the National Bureau of Statistics of China estimates the township's population now to be 13,381.

Transportation
The National Highway G219 passes across the township north to south.

References

Bibliography

Divisions of Jiangcheng Hani and Yi Autonomous County